Norman Jack Thompson (born March 5, 1945) is a former National Football League cornerback who played with the St. Louis Cardinals and the Baltimore Colts. He became in 1977 the first free agent in NFL history to sign with another team, when he went to the Colts from the Cardinals.

1945 births
Living people
Players of American football from San Francisco
American football cornerbacks
St. Louis Cardinals (football) players
Baltimore Colts players
Utah Utes football players